Charles Ferguson may refer to:
Charles A. Ferguson (1921–1998), Stanford University linguist
Charles Frederick Ferguson (c. 1833–1909), Canadian member of parliament
Charles Ferguson (filmmaker) (born 1955), co-founder of Vermeer Technologies Inc. and film director
Charles John Ferguson (1840–1904), English architect

See also 
Charley Ferguson (1939–2023), American football player
Charlie Ferguson (disambiguation)
Charles Fergusson (disambiguation)
Charles Ferguson Hoey (1914–1944), Canadian recipient of the VC
Charles Ferguson Smith (1807–1862), U.S. army officer